The Revindicating Revolution was a civil war in Venezuela between supporters and opponents of Antonio Guzmán Blanco, fought between December 1878 and February 1879.

Origin 
The government of President Francisco Linares Alcántara had been characterized by strong anti-Guzmancism, toppling statues of Guzmán Blanco and persecuting his supporters. Linares Alcántara would die in November 1878, then the constituent assembly would elect Linares Alcántara supporter José Gregorio Valera as President of the Republic.

 was appointed vice president, a position he refused to accept, proclaiming on 29 December 1878 the autonomy of the Carabobo state and ignoring the Valera government. Cedeño, head of the revindicators, led the campaign during January 1879. On 13 February, the Revindicators Army entered Caracas and Guzmán Blanco returned to power.

Bibliography 

 Rondón Márquez, Rafael Ángel (1952). Guzmán Blanco, el autócrata civilizador. Madrid: Imprenta García Vicente.
 Guzmán Blanco, Antonio (1879). La Reivindicación. Documentos del General Guzmán Blanco. Caracas: Imprenta de la Gaceta Oficial.

References 

Wars involving Venezuela
1870s in Venezuela
1879 in Venezuela